Isen Abbey (Kloster Isen) was a Benedictine abbey, later a collegiate foundation, at Isen in Bavaria, Germany.

History
Dedicated to Saint Zeno of Verona, the abbey was founded by members of the Fagana family, an indigenous Bavarian noble clan, and by Bishop Joseph of Freising (also known as Joseph of Verona) in the 8th century, about 752. It was one of the oldest monasteries on ancient Bavarian soil. Until the beginning of the 12th century it was Benedictine, but afterwards became a collegiate foundation.

It was dissolved during the secularisation of Bavaria in 1802. The premises and the abbey's seven farms passed into private ownership, while St. Zeno's church, with a house for the priest, became the parish church of Isen.

Burials
Joseph of Freising

References
 Heilmaier, Ludwig, 1938. Das obere Isental und das Kloster Isen. Evenhausen: self-published.
 Heilmaier, Ludwig, 1920. Die Kirche St. Zeno in Isen. Munich: self-published.
 Various authors, 1984. Isen 550 Jahre Markt. Isen: Nußrainer.

External links
 Klöster in Bayern 

Monasteries in Bavaria
Benedictine monasteries in Germany
Christian monasteries established in the 8th century
1802 disestablishments
Erding (district)